The Fifth Federal Electoral District of Chihuahua (V Distrito Electoral Federal de Chihuahua) is one of the 300 Electoral Districts into which Mexico is divided for the purpose of elections to the federal Chamber of Deputies and one of nine such districts in the state of Chihuahua.

It elects one deputy to the lower house of Congress for each three-year legislative period, by means of the first past the post system.

District territory
Under the 2005 districting scheme, Chihuahua's Fifth District covers the municipalities of Aldama, Allende, Aquiles Serdán, Camargo, Coronado, Coyame del Sotol, Delicias, Jiménez, Julimes, La Cruz, López, Manuel Benavides, Meoqui, Ojinaga, Rosales, San Francisco de Conchos and Saucillo.

The district's head town (cabecera distrital), where results from individual polling stations are gathered together and collated, is the city of Delicias.

Previous districting schemes

1996–2005 district
Between 1996 and 2005, the Fifth District was located in the same region of the state, with a slightly different configuration. It covered the municipalities of Aldama, Aquiles Serdán, Camargo, Coyame del Sotol, Delicias, Julimes, La Cruz, Manuel Benavides, Meoqui, Ojinaga, Rosales, San Francisco de Conchos and Saucillo.

1979–1996 district
Between 1979 and 1996, the Fifth District was located in the west of the state, covering a large area of the Sierra Madre Occidental. It was  centred on the city of Vicente Guerrero, Chihuahua.

Deputies returned to Congress from this district

L Legislature
 1976–1979:  Artemio Iglesias (PRI)
LI Legislature
 1979–1982:  Enrique Pérez González (PRI)
LII Legislature
 1982–1985:  Samuel Díaz Olguín (PRI)
LIII Legislature
 1985–1988:  Alonso Aguirre Ramos (PRI)
LIV Legislature
 1988–1991:  Jorge Esteban Sandoval (PRI)
LV Legislature
 1991–1994:  Pablo Israel Esparza Natividad (PRI)
LVI Legislature
 1994–1997:  Saúl González Herrera (PRI)
LVII Legislature
 1997–2000:  Ignacio Arrieta Aragón (PRI)
LVIII Legislature
 2000–2003:  César Reyes Roel (PAN)
LIX Legislature
 2003–2006:  Fernando Álvarez Monje (PAN)
LX Legislature
 2006–2009:  Felipe González Ruiz (PAN)

References

Federal electoral districts of Mexico
Chihuahua (state)